Hans Habe (born János Békessy; 12 February 1911, Budapest – 29 September 1977, Locarno) was a Hungarian and American writer and newspaper publisher.  From 1941, he held United States citizenship. He was also known by such pseudonyms as Antonio Corte, Frank Richard, Frederick Gert, John Richler, Hans Wolfgang, and Alexander Holmes.

Life

Early years

Habe was born as János Békessy in Budapest, Kingdom of Hungary, Austro-Hungarian Empire. His parents, Imre Békessy and Bianca Marton, were of Jewish origin but converted to the Christian (Protestant) faith.

After World War I the family moved to Vienna where his father published one of the first daily tabloids, Die Stunde (The Hour), from 1923 to 1926. János was educated at the Franz-Joseph-Gymnasium between 1921 and 1929. Afterwards he started to study Law and German Literature at Heidelberg, but returned soon to Vienna due to the rapidly growing extreme anti-Semitism in Germany.

Newspaperman

In 1930 he began to work as a reporter for the Wiener Sonn- und Montagspost (Vienna Sunday and Monday Post). In the following year he became Editor of the Österreichische Abendzeitung (Austrian Evening News), one of the youngest newspaper editors ever, at age 20. Around this time he married his first wife, Margit Bloch.

Early in 1934 he moved to the Wiener Morgen (Vienna Morning News). From 1935 to 1939 he was a Foreign Correspondent for the Prager Tagblatt (Prague Daily News), stationed mostly at Geneva, covering the League of Nations and was present at the Évian Conference in 1938. Habe described the course of the Conference in his novel The Mission (1965). The focal point of the novel is the infamous offer made by the German government, and transmitted to the Conference by Neumann von Héthárs, to sell the Austrian Jews to foreign countries at a price of $250 per capita, and the Conference delegates' refusal to accept. At this time Habe was married to his second wife, Erika Levy, heiress of the Tungsram light bulb company.

Soldier in World War II

After the Anschluss, Habe was expatriated and his books forbidden by the new Nazi government. He went into exile in France and joined the French Foreign Legion. In 1940 he was captured and interned in the Dieuze transit camp. From there he managed to escape with the help of French friends (to Lisbon) and immigrated to the United States. He became a US citizen by naturalization in 1941. Habe married his third wife, Eleanor Post Hutton, heiress of General Foods, in 1942. They had a son, Anthony Niklas Habe.

In 1942 he was drafted into the US Army and trained in psychological warfare at the Military Intelligence Training Center at Camp Ritchie, Maryland. Then he joined the 1st Mobile Radio Broadcasting Company and went in March 1943 to North Africa to participate in Operation Avalanche, the landing in Italy.

In 1944 he became an instructor of psychological warfare at Camp Sharpe, near Gettysburg, Pennsylvania. In autumn 1944 he selected a group of German writers and newspaper editors to prepare for the publishing of new newspapers after the war in Germany.

Newspaperman in Germany

In 1945, Habe returned to Germany in the wake of the occupying US Army. By November 1945 he had created 18 newspapers in the American Occupation Zone. Then he became Editor of the Neue Zeitung in Munich.

At this time he was married for a short time to actress Ali Ghito. In 1949 he moved to the Münchner Illustrierte (Munich Illustrated), and, in 1951, to the Echo der Woche (Echo of the Week). From 1952 to 1953 he wrote the column Outside America for the Los Angeles Daily News. When the Echo der Woche ceased to appear in 1953, he settled in Ascona, Switzerland, and wrote mostly novels.

Murder of daughter
In 1948, he married his fifth wife, American actress Eloise Hardt (17 September 1917 – 25 June 2017); the couple had one child, Marina Elizabeth Habe (23 February 1951 – 30 December 1968), who was murdered at age 17. She was a student at the University of Hawaii home on vacation when she was murdered in Los Angeles. According to the autopsy report, Habe's body was found fully clothed, with the exception of one shoe lying nearby. Her throat had been slashed and she had received numerous knife wounds to the chest. She suffered multiple contusions to the face and throat, and had been garrotted. No alcohol or barbiturates were found in her blood. There was no evidence of rape. Habe was abducted outside the home of her mother in West Hollywood, 8962 Cynthia Avenue. The neighborhood had been the location of a number of rapes in the weeks prior to her murder. A former Manson Family associate claimed members of the Family had known Habe and it was conjectured she had been one of their victims. Los Angeles County coroner Thomas Noguchi recorded that the teenager bled to death.

Survived by both parents, Marina Habe was buried in Holy Cross Cemetery, Culver City following a requiem mass at Good Shepherd Roman Catholic Church in Beverly Hills.

Habe's sixth and last wife was Hungarian actress and singer Licci Balla; they wed in 1954.

Prizes
1942 Jerusalem Medaille
1945 Luxembourg War Cross
1972 Theodor-Herzl-Preis
1976 Großes Bundesverdienstkreuz
1977 Konrad-Adenauer-Preis

Works
Drei über die Grenze (1936)
Eine Welt bricht zusammen (1937)
Tödlicher Friede (1939), also published as Zu spät? (1939) and in American edition as Sixteen Days
Kathrin oder der verlorene Frühling (1943)
Wohin wir gehören (1946)
Ob Tausend fallen (1941, A Thousand Shall Fall, about his war experiences in the French Foreign Legion)
Walk in Darkness (1948)
The Black Earth (1952)
Ich stelle mich (1954, autobiography)
Off limits (1955); Off limits, English translation by Ewald Osers published in Great Britain by Harrap, London, 1956 with dust-wrapper by George Adamson
Im Namen des Teufels (1956) (filmed in 1962 as The Devil's Agent).
Die Rote Sichel (1959)
Ilona (1960)
Die Tarnowska (1962; Countess Tarnovska)
Tod in Texas (1964)
Die Mission (1965, The Mission (first published in Great Britain by George G. Harrap & Co. Limited, London, 1966)
Christoph und sein Vater (1966)
Im Jahre Null (1966)
Das Netz (1969)
Wien, so wie es war (1969)
Erfahrungen (1973)
Palazzo (1975)
Leben für den Journalismus (München : Droemer Knaur, 1976. )
Weg ins Dunkel (1977)
Ungarischer Tanz
Wie einst David

Film adaptations
The Cross of Lorraine, directed by Tay Garnett (1943, based on the novel A Thousand Shall Fall)

The Ambassador, directed by Harald Braun (West Germany, 1960, based on the novel Die Botschafterin — under the pen name Hans Wolfgang)
The Devil's Agent, directed by John Paddy Carstairs (UK, 1962, based on the novel Im Namen des Teufels)
, directed by Géza von Radványi (West Germany, 1966, based on a story by Hans Habe)
The Net, directed by Manfred Purzer (West Germany, 1975, based on the novel Das Netz)
Mission to Evian, directed by Erika Szántó (Hungary, 1988, based on the novel Die Mission)

References

External links

1911 births
1977 deaths
Commanders Crosses of the Order of Merit of the Federal Republic of Germany
People with acquired American citizenship
United States Army personnel of World War II
American newspaper people
Hungarian Christians
Hungarian people of Jewish descent
American people of Hungarian-Jewish descent
Writers from Budapest
Soldiers of the French Foreign Legion
United States Army soldiers
20th-century American writers
20th-century American male writers
Ritchie Boys
Hungarian emigrants to the United States